Southend Civic Centre is a municipal building in Victoria Avenue, Southend-on-Sea, Essex, England. The structure is the meeting place of Southend-on-Sea City Council.

History
The first municipal building in Southend was the municipal offices in Clarence Road completed in 1883. Following significant population growth, largely associated with the status of Southend as a seaside resort, the area became a municipal borough in 1892 and a county borough in 1914. As the responsibilities of the council increased, it secured additional office accommodation around Southend, but in the 1940s, the civic leaders decided to co-locate all its staff in one location: the site they selected on the east side of Victoria Avenue was occupied by three large private houses and by a school.

The new building was designed by the borough architect, Patrick Burridge,  in the International Style, built in concrete and glass and was officially opened by Queen Elizabeth The Queen Mother on 31 October 1967. The design involved a 16-storey rectangular tower block with 20 bays facing onto Victoria Avenue and 10 bays at either end; the council chamber was contained in a separate two-storey structure built to the south west of the main building.

A fountain, which took the form of three stone slabs located around a stone trough, was designed by William Mitchell and placed in the civic square adjacent to the civic centre at the time of its opening. The three slabs evoked local history by displaying carvings of the borough coat of arms, a local fisherman and a monk from Prittlewell Priory.

The council also commissioned a bronze sculpture entitled "Leda and the Swan" which was designed by Lucette Cartwright. It was initially placed outside the Court House further south along Victoria Avenue but when councillors decided to relocate the sculpture to the civic square there was a backlash from protestors who objected to the sexual nature of the artist's work which depicted the thunder god, Zeus, in the form of a swan, raping a woman. The sculpture was initially moved to the courtyard of the Palace Theatre in Westcliff-on-Sea and but it was later relocated to the mayor's residence where it was placed safely out of  view.

The civic centre remained the local seat of power following the formation of the enlarged Southend-on-Sea Borough Council in 1974. A Union Flag, which had been raised at the civic centre on special occasions, including the death of the Queen Mother, was stolen from the civic centre, to much dismay, in April 2002.

References

Government buildings completed in 1967
City and town halls in Essex
Buildings and structures in Southend-on-Sea